Jorge Vargas (born 8 February 1976 in Santiago de Chile) is a Chilean football manager and former football defender, currently in charge as head coach of Pro Patria.

Club career
Vargas debuted in his country's first division in 1995, while playing for Huachipato on loan from Universidad Católica. After returning from his loan spell Vargas received little playing time for Universidad Católica, and was consequently loaned out during the 1997 season to Coquimbo Unido, where he began to make a name for himself with his solid play. His play did not go unnoticed by Universidad Católica as he returned to the club and began to feature regularly. By 1999 Vargas established himself as the symbol and most prominent member of the club appearing in 38 matches and netting 3 goals. Vargas started drawing interest from Italian clubs and by the end of 1999 was sold to Reggina.

With Reggina in the Italian serie A Vargas enjoyed the most successful part of his career, in four years he appeared in 97 league matches scoring 3 goals. In 2003/04 Vargas joined Empoli, but was unable to help the club avoid relegation. After his negative experience with Empoli, Vargas signed with A.S Livorno, where he recaptured the form that made him a standout for Reggina. In two years at the Tuscan club Vargas appeared in 55 league matches.

After his successful serie A career Vargas signed on with top Austrian club Red Bull Salzburg for the 2006/07 season. He appeared in 26 league matches helping the club to the Austrian Bundesliga crown.

On 29 July 2008, Vargas joined the recently relegated Italian side Empoli.

On 25 November 2009, Vargas joined to Spezia Calcio, team from the Serie C2 in Italy.

Managerial career
In 2016, he began his managerial career at the youth categories of Reggina. After managing ASD Aurora Reggio and working as the assistant of Roberto Donadoni for Shenzhen F.C., in 2021 he became the manager of Vigor Lamezia in the Eccellenza Calabria. After leaving Vigor Lamezia by the end of the season, on 30 June 2022 he was unveiled as the new head coach of Serie C club Pro Patria.

National team

Vargas made his international debut for Chile on 28 April 1999. He cemented a starting role during his countries 4th-place finish during 1999 Copa América. During the latter months of 2006 and early 2007 Vargas was captain of the Chile national team. In July 2007 he was penalised by the Chilean Football Federation with a 20 match ban for his role in the unruly celebrations for qualifying to the second round of 2007 Copa América, in which several members of the team in a drunken state caused problems at the teams camp. Vargas to this day denies his role.

Vargas has represented Chile 52 times, scoring a lone goal versus Uruguay from the penalty spot.

References

External links
 

1976 births
Living people
Footballers from Santiago
Chilean footballers
Chilean expatriate footballers
Club Deportivo Universidad Católica footballers
C.D. Huachipato footballers
Coquimbo Unido footballers
Reggina 1914 players
Empoli F.C. players
U.S. Livorno 1915 players
FC Red Bull Salzburg players
Spezia Calcio players
San Luis de Quillota footballers
Deportes La Serena footballers
Chilean Primera División players
Serie A players
Serie B players
Austrian Football Bundesliga players
Expatriate footballers in Italy
Chilean expatriate sportspeople in Italy
Expatriate footballers in Austria
Chilean expatriate sportspeople in Austria
Association football defenders
Chile under-20 international footballers
Chile international footballers
2007 Copa América players
Chilean football managers
Aurora Pro Patria 1919 managers
Eccellenza managers
Serie C managers
Chilean expatriate football managers
Expatriate football managers in China
Chilean expatriate sportspeople in China
Expatriate football managers in Italy
Chilean emigrants to Italy